Major-General William Pat Arthur Bradshaw  (8 March 1897 − 9 April 1966) was a British Army officer.

Biography
Educated at Eton College and Royal Military College, Sandhurst, Bradshaw was commissioned into the Scots Guards in 1914. He was deployed to France and was mentioned in dispatches and appointed a Companion of the Distinguished Service Order in 1917.

After serving as ADC to the Viceroy of India, Bradshaw became commanding officer of the 2nd Battalion, Scots Guards in 1935 and commander of the Scots Guards Regiment and Regimental District in 1938.

He became commander of 4th (London) Infantry Brigade, which was later renamed the 140th (London) Infantry Brigade, in August 1939. He went on to be commander of commander of 24th Independent Brigade in November 1941, General Officer Commanding 59th (Staffordshire) Infantry Division in April 1942 and General Officer Commanding  48th (South Midland) Division in March 1944 before retiring in May 1946.

Family
In 1938 he married a daughter of Lord Cadman.

References

Bibliography

External links
Generals of World War II

|-

1897 births
1966 deaths
People educated at Eton College
Graduates of the Royal Military College, Sandhurst
Scots Guards officers
British Army personnel of World War I
British Army generals of World War II
Companions of the Order of the Bath
Companions of the Distinguished Service Order
British Army major generals